Shaamar is a sum (district) of Selenge Province in northern Mongolia. The Dulaankhaan urban-type settlement is 35 km S from Shaamar sum center. In 2008, its population was 4,158.

The sum center settlement of Shaamar is divided into two parts, about 8 miles apart. Upper Shaamar is located on a flat part of a hill and lower Shaamar on the banks of the Selenge River. Lower Shaamar has access to the railway station and water from the river.

Shaamar was established as a negdel (agricultural cooperative) during the agricultural movement of the 1930s in Mongolia. Today, the local economy is mainly supported by vegetables, cattle, pork, poultry, and lumber.

References 

Districts of Selenge Province